Sabana may refer to:

Places
 Sabana, Orocovis, Puerto Rico, a barrio in Puerto Rico
 Sabana, Vega Alta, Puerto Rico, a barrio in Puerto Rico
 Sabana, Luquillo, Puerto Rico, a barrio in Puerto Rico
 Sabana, Boven Saramacca, Suriname, a village or town in Boven Saramacca municipality (resort) in Sipaliwini District in Suriname
 Sabana, Para, Suriname,  a village or town in Para, Suriname